The Graustock is a mountain of the Urner Alps, located south of Engelberg in Central Switzerland. The summit is one of the two tripoints between the cantons of Berne, Nidwalden and Obwalden (the other being the Jochstock).

On the north side of the mountain lies the Trüebsee.

References

External links
 Graustock on Hikr

Mountains of the Alps
Mountains of Switzerland
Mountains of the canton of Bern
Mountains of Obwalden
Mountains of Nidwalden
Bern–Obwalden border
Nidwalden–Obwalden border
Bern–Nidwalden border
Two-thousanders of Switzerland
Kerns, Switzerland